Lukas Hartmann (29 August 1944 born as Hans-Rudolf Lehmann) is a Swiss author.

Life and work 
Born as Hans-Rudolf Lehmann in Bern, his mother was a farmer's daughter and his father was a shoemaker, later auxiliary postman and department manager at the Swiss Post. His mother had a creative streak, which passed to both sons. Hartmann's younger brother Jürg became a journalist, and now heads the Ringier Group school of journalism. Lukas Hartmann wrote his first stories at the age of 13. He completed a teacher training course in Bern with majors in German, history and music, and worked first as a teacher. He then decided to pursue further studies in psychology, but he did not graduate, and later worked as a social worker, journalist and writer. His novels Anna - annA and Pestalozzis Berg have been filmed.

Hartmann's grandmother was one of the so-called Verdingkinder, hence Hartmann is one of the most prominent supporters of the so-called Wiedergutmachungsinitiative. In April 2018, Ein Bild von Lydia was published, a historical novel about Lydia Welti-Escher.

Since 1996 Hartmann has been married to the Swiss politician Simonetta Sommaruga. At the end of October 2022, he suffered a stroke, so his wife announced her resignation as Federal Councillor at the end of 2022.

Awards (excerpt) 
 1995: Schweizer Jugendbuchpreis for So eine lange Nase.
 2010: Grosser Literaturpreis von Stadt und Kanton Bern

Bibliography (highlights)

Novels
 1978: Pestalozzis Berg. Zytglogge, Gümligen, .
 1980: Gebrochenes Eis: Aufzeichnungen. Arche, Zürich, .
 1982: Mahabalipuram oder Als Schweizer in Indien. Ein Reisetagebuch. Arche, Zürich, .
 2003: Die Tochter des Jägers. Nagel & Kimche, Zürich, .
 2013: Abschied von Sansibar. Diogenes, Zürich, .
 2015: Auf beiden Seiten. Diogenes, Zürich, .
 2016: Ein passender Mieter, Diogenes, Zürich, 
 2018: Ein Bild von Lydia, Diogenes, Zürich, 
 2021: Schattentanz: Die Wege des Louis Soutter, Diogenes, Zürich,

Children's literature 
 1984: Anna annA. Zytglogge, Gümligen, .
 1987: Joachim zeichnet sich weg. Ein Roman für Kinder. Nagel & Kimche, Zürich, .
 1990: Die wilde Sophie. Nagel & Kimche, Zürich, .
 1994: So eine lange Nase. Nagel & Kimche, Zürich, .
 2006: Heul nicht, kleiner Seehund! Kinderroman. Illustrations by Julia Friese. Bajazzo, Zürich, .
 2007: Spuren in der Polenta. Essgeschichten und Rezepte für Kinder. Illustrations by Larissa Bertonasco. Bajazzo, Zürich, .

Plays 
 1976: Beruhigungsmittel.
 1977: Familiefescht.

Radio 
 1976: Em Pfarrer sy Scheidig for Schweizer Radio DRS.
 1984: Auf dem Scherbenberg for DRS.

Literature

References

External links 
  
 
 
 
 

1944 births
Writers from Bern
Swiss male novelists
Swiss poets in German
20th-century Swiss poets
20th-century male writers
20th-century Swiss novelists
Swiss children's writers
Living people
Swiss male poets
21st-century Swiss poets
21st-century Swiss novelists
21st-century male writers
Husbands of national leaders